Mehringdamm is a Berlin U-Bahn station located on the  and the .

History

Opened in 1924 as Belle-Alliance Straße it was built by Grenander and later renovated by Rümmler. The station's ceiling collapsed during the Battle of Berlin.

In 1946 the station was renamed Franz-Mehring-Straße, after the socialist politician.

In 1947, the station received its current name Mehringdamm. Following renovations in 1965, passengers could transfer from the U6 to the U7 on the same platform.

References

External links

U6 (Berlin U-Bahn) stations
U7 (Berlin U-Bahn) stations
Buildings and structures in Friedrichshain-Kreuzberg
Railway stations in Germany opened in 1924